Frank Gabrielson (March 13, 1910 – January 24, 1980) was an American stage, film, and television writer.  His stage work includes The Wizard of Oz as adapted in 1942 for The Muny, Days of Our Youth, also performed as The Bo Tree and Most Likely to Succeed (1939) and The Great Whitewash, also known as The More the Merrier, co-written with Irvin Pincus, (1941).  He was also contributed to Jerome Moross's revue, Parade (1935).

Screenwriting credits include Something for the Boys (1944), Don Juan Quilligan (1945), It Shouldn't Happen to a Dog (1946), and Flight of the Doves (1971).

His television work includes Leave It to Beaver, National Velvet, Mama, The Real McCoys, Suspense, and Alfred Hitchcock Presents, among others.  He wrote several episodes of Shirley Temple's Storybook, including The Land of Oz episode.

Gabrielson was married to actress Franc Hale. He died in 1980.

Selected filmography
 It Shouldn't Happen to a Dog (1946)

References

External links
 Frank Gabrielson on IMDb

American male screenwriters
1910 births
1980 deaths
20th-century American dramatists and playwrights
American male dramatists and playwrights
Burials at Oakwood Cemetery (Syracuse, New York)
20th-century American male writers
20th-century American screenwriters